Antonella Benedettini is the ambassador of San Marino to Belgium and Iceland as well as the Permanent Representative to the European Union. She is the chief negotiator of San Marino with the European Union for an association agreement.

See also
San Marino–European Union relations

References

1958 births
Living people
Sammarinese women diplomats
Ambassadors of San Marino to Belgium
Ambassadors of San Marino to Iceland
Permanent Representatives of San Marino to the European Union
IULM University of Milan alumni
21st-century diplomats
Sammarinese women ambassadors